Crime of the Century is a 1996 HBO television film directed by Mark Rydell. It presents a dramatization of the Lindbergh kidnapping of 1932. The film stars Stephen Rea as Bruno Hauptmann and Isabella Rossellini as his wife Anna.

Plot
The film, like Ludovic Kennedy's 1985 book The Airman and the Carpenter upon which it is based, presents Bruno Richard Hauptmann as not guilty of the Lindbergh abduction and murder for which he was tried and executed. It suggests at least one of the perpetrators was Isidor Fisch, an associate of Hauptmann's who had conned several of the local German community out of money and who returned to Germany after the Lindbergh baby was found.

Cast
 Stephen Rea as Bruno Hauptman
 Isabella Rossellini as Anna Hauptman
 J.T. Walsh as Colonel Norman Schwarzkopf Sr.
 Michael Moriarty as New Jersey Governor Harold Hoffman
 Allen Garfield as Lieutenant James Finn
 John Harkins as Edward Reilly
 Barry Primus as Ellis Parker
 David Paymer as David Wilentz 
 Bert Remsen as Dr. John Condon
 Scott N. Stevens as Colonel Charles Lindbergh

Awards
The film earned five Golden Globe nominations in the "Mini-Series or Motion Picture made for TV" categories. The film was nominated for the Outstanding Casting for a Miniseries or a Special, Outstanding Directing for a Miniseries or a Special, Outstanding Editing for a Miniseries or a Special - Single Camera Production and Outstanding Writing for a Miniseries or a Special at the 49th Primetime Emmy Awards.

See also
 Presumption of guilt

References

1996 television films
1996 films
HBO Films films
1990s English-language films
Crime films based on actual events
Cultural depictions of Charles Lindbergh
Lindbergh kidnapping
Films directed by Mark Rydell
Films scored by John Frizzell (composer)